Fjøløy is an island in Stavanger municipality in Rogaland county, Norway.  The  island lies on the south side of the Boknafjorden in the Rennesøy island group.  The island lies immediately south of the island of Klosterøy and west of the island of Mosterøy. The island is connected to the mainland city of Stavanger by a series of bridges and tunnels.  The Fjøløy Lighthouse is located on the western end of the island.

See also
List of islands of Norway

References

Islands of Stavanger